Ulmus 'Columella' is a Dutch elm cultivar raised by the Dorschkamp Research Institute for Forestry & Landscape Planning, Wageningen, from a selfed or openly pollinated seedling of the hybrid clone 'Plantyn' sown in 1967. It was released for sale in 1989 after proving extremely resistant to Dutch elm disease following inoculation with unnaturally high doses of the pathogen, Ophiostoma novo-ulmi. However, propagated by grafting onto wych elm rootstocks, graft failure owing to incompatibility has become a common occurrence in the Netherlands.

Description
'Columella' makes a tall, fastigiate tree with very upright branches, but broadens in later years .

Pests and diseases
Rated 5 out of 5, 'Columella' has a very high resistance to Dutch elm disease.

Cultivation
Wind resistant, the tree has been planted throughout the Netherlands, where its columnar shape has made it popular as a street tree. It is commonly found in Amsterdam, where it has been widely planted as a replacement for the similarly fastigiate Guernsey Elm, U. minor 'Sarniensis' , itself a replacement for the Belgian Elm, Ulmus × hollandica 'Belgica', which had succumbed so readily to the earlier strain of Dutch elm disease after World War I. 'Columella' has also been planted to replace Guernsey Elm in Edinburgh.

In trials conducted by Butterfly Conservation in southern Hampshire, England, 'Columella' was the only cultivar to become distressed during the drought of 2006, shedding most of its foliage by early August; a trait possibly inherited from one of the tree's ancestors, the Himalayan elm Ulmus wallichiana. 'Columella' first flowered aged 8 years, in March; the resultant seeds were found to have a moderate viability.  'Columella' featured in New Zealand government trials during the 1990s at the Hortresearch station, Palmerston North.

Hybrid cultivars
Clone FL 666 (Heybroek's 405* ×  'Columella'), Florence. Not in commerce. *(U. × hollandica × U. minor)
Clone FL 589 ('San Zanobi' ×  'Columella'), Istituto per la Protezione delle Piante, Florence. Not in commerce.

Etymology
The hybrid is named for the Roman agronomist Columella, who introduced the Atinian elm (now more commonly known as the English elm) to Spain from Italy circa .

Accessions

North America
United States National Arboretum, Washington, D.C., US. Acc. no. Q28832 (quarantine)

Europe
 , Monthodon, France. No details available.
Brighton and Hove City Council, UK. Plant Heritage Elm Collection. East Drive, Queen's Park.
Grange Farm Arboretum, Sutton St James, Spalding, Lincolnshire, UK. Acc. no. 818.
Great Fontley, Fareham, UK. Butterfly Conservation Elm Trials plantation, planted 2003.
Wijdemeren City Council, Netherlands. Elm Collection, first 3 planted ~1990 Loosdrecht.

Nurseries

Europe
Potted whips.
Boomwekerijen 'De Batterijen' , Ochten, Netherlands.
Boomkwekerij 't Herenland , Randwijk, Netherlands.
Coles Nurseries , Thurnby, Leicester, UK. 
Hillier Nurseries , Ampfield, UK. 
Lorenz von Ehren, Hamburg, Germany. 
Noordplant , Glimmen, Netherlands.
Paramount Plants & Gardens Ltd , Enfield, London, UK.
PlantenTuin Esveld , Boskoop, Netherlands.
UmbraFlor , Spello, Italy.
Van Den Berk (UK) Ltd., London, UK
Westerveld Boomkwekerij B.V., Opheusden, Netherlands.

References

Hybrid elm cultivar
Ulmus articles with images
Ulmus